Actinopyga palauensis, the Panning's blackfish, is a species of sea cucumber within the family Holothuriidae. The species distribution is in the western Pacific near areas such as Palau, the Federated States of Micronesia, Tonga, Niue, eastern Australia, and New Caledonia. It lives in reef environments at depths up to 30 meters, often being found crawling on sandy reef slopes, course sand with reef rubble, semi-sheltered bay reefs, and is occasionally found in lagoons and inshore reefs.

Actinopyga palauensis is blackish-brown in coloration, but appears entirely black at depth, with a bumpy texture and small sparces of papillae. The teeth are orange and noticably rough. It grows to a max length of 40 centimeters, but individuals are more commonly found at 30 centimeters. It can weigh up to 500 grams. The max reported age of an individual was 6 years.

Conservation 
Actinopyga palauensis is commonly fished in many parts of its range, however it is considered a minor commercial species in terms of catch, and no catch records suggest that the current population of the species is declining from being harvested. No conservation measures have been made towards the species, but it does occur in at least 1 marine protected area within its range. For these reasons the IUCN Red List has classified the species as 'Least concern'.

References 

Animals described in 1944
Holothuriidae
IUCN Red List least concern species
Marine fauna of Oceania
Fauna of New Caledonia
Fauna of Niue